Edmund Gussmann (January 27, 1945 in Lubichów - September 2, 2010 in Gdynia) was a Polish linguist, phonologist, English philologist, Icelandist, celtologist.

Career
He graduated in English Philology from the University of Warsaw in 1968. In the years 1968–1970 he also studied Icelandic and Germanic linguistics at the University of Reykjavik. In 1970, he joined the Maria Curie-Skłodowska University in Lublin, where in 1973 he defended his doctorate, and in 1978 he obtained his habilitation. In the years 1979–1980 he was the Director of the Institute of English Studies at UMCS. In 1981 he became the director of the Institute of English Philology at the Catholic University of Lublin. It was then that he obtained the degree of associate professor. In 1985 he became an associate professor, and in 1992 - a full professor.

Works
 1978 – Contrastive Polish-English Consonantal Phonology (Wyd. PWN)
 1980 – Studies in Abstract Phonology (Wyd. MIT Press)
 1980 – Introduction to Phonological Analysis (Wyd. PWN)
 1985 (Red.) – Phono-morphology : Studies in the Interaction of Phonology and Morphology (Wyd. RW KUL)
 1987 (Red.) – Rules and the Lexicon : Studies in Word-formation (Wyd. RW KUL)
 1991 (z Aidanem Doyle'em) – An Ghaeilge : podręcznik do nauki języka irlandzkiego (Wyd. RW KUL)
 1995 (Red.) – Licensing in Syntax and Phonology (Wyd. Folium)
 2002 – Phonology: analysis and theory (Wyd. Cambridge University Press)
 2004 A Reverse Dictionary of Modern Irish (Wyd. Folium)
 2006 – Icelandic and Universal Phonology (Wyd. Bruno-Kress-Vorlesung 2005)
 2007 – The Phonology of Polish (Wyd. Oxford University Press)

References 

Celtic studies scholars
Academic staff of the John Paul II Catholic University of Lublin
2010 deaths
Academic staff of Maria Curie-Skłodowska University
Academic staff of the University of Gdańsk
1945 births
Linguists from Poland
Phonologists